The Mountbatten School is an 11–16 secondary school located on Whitenap Lane in Romsey, Hampshire, England. The school is an Academy, but opened in 1969 as a comprehensive.

Specialist status and national awards
The school became a Language College in 2000, and gained Sports College status in September 2004. In September 2006, the school became the hub of the Mountbatten School Sports Partnership with several local schools. The school holds several national awards: High Performing Specialist School (2008, 2009, 2010, 2011); International Schools Award (2007, 2011); Arts Mark Gold Award (2007, 2011); Youth Sports Trust Gold Partner (2011); Get Set Olympic Network (2010); Eco Schools award (2009) and Ofsted Lead Behaviour School (2008).

In 2012, the school was recognised by the Specialist Schools and Academies Trust as one of the hundred most-improved schools in England. The school joined the Leading Edge Network in 2012.

Facilities

Following a number of successful financial appeals and external funding bids, the school facilities have grown and developed since 1969. The original building, the Viceroy's Building, contains the school hall, English, Science, and the dining hall facilities.  Humanities and Art are housed in the Lower Humanities Building and the Jubilee Building which was refurbished in 2012. Sport has the original gymnasium, a sports hall opened in 1985 by Prince Charles, a fitness suite (which is also open to the public), and a sports science laboratory. ICT and technology are housed in the Mulberry Building, which was rebuilt in 2013. Modern foreign languages and mathematics are located in the Brabourne Building, opened by Patricia, the late Countess Mountbatten of Burma, in 1985. The Lantern Theatre building contains the drama and music rooms, including a recording studio and theatre. There is a separate dedicated Student Services Building which following rebuilding was opened in 2014.

The school's trading subsidiary, Personal Best Education, is housed in the Malta Building.

There are three Mac suites for music and art. There are extensive playing fields and play courts.

Academy status
The Mountbatten School gained academy status on 1 April 2011.

Notable alumni

 Terry Bartlett - gymnast, competed for Great Britain at the 1984, 1988 and 1992 Olympic Games.
 Steve Basham - former professional footballer; played 19 games for Southampton F.C. in the Premier League.
 Joe Brooks - singer / songwriter.
 Laura Carmichael - actress.
 Andy Cook - former professional footballer.
 Julia Copus - poet, biographer and children's writer.
 Richard Dibden - former Hampshire cricketer.
 Charlie Dimmock - television presenter and gardener.
 Sarah-Jane Hutt - Miss World in 1983.
 Lukas Jutkiewicz - former Swindon and Everton striker, now playing for Birmingham City.
 Martin Kellaway - cricketer.
 Sam McQueen - former Southampton F.C. professional footballer.
 Melanie Purkiss - athlete. Reached the semi-finals of the 400 metres in the 2002 Commonwealth Games.

References

External links
 Official website

Educational institutions established in 1969
Secondary schools in Hampshire
1969 establishments in England
Academies in Hampshire
Romsey
Specialist language colleges in England
Specialist sports colleges in England